The Purefoy Baronetcy, of Wadley in the County of Berkshire, was a title in the Baronetage of England.  It was created on 4 December 1662 for the six-year-old Henry Purefoy . The title became extinct on his death in 1686.

Purefoy baronets, of Wadley (1662)
Sir Henry Purefoy, 1st Baronet (1656–1686)

References

Extinct baronetcies in the Baronetage of England